The 2001 Kansas Jayhawks football team represented the University of Kansas in the 2001 NCAA Division I-A football season. They participated as members of the Big 12 Conference in the North Division. They were coached by head coach Terry Allen, who was fired on November 4 and replaced by interim head coach Tom Hayes. They played their home games at Memorial Stadium in Lawrence, Kansas.

Schedule

References

Kansas
Kansas Jayhawks football seasons
Kansas Jayhawks football